List of records of Thailand is an annotated list of Thai records organised by category.

Buildings 

 The tallest structure: Magnolias Waterfront Residences Iconsiam, Khlong San, Bangkok, 318 m.
The tallest stupa: Phra Pathommachedi, Nakhon Pathom, 120 m.
The tallest statue: Great Buddha of Thailand, Ang Thong, 92m.
The tallest hotel: Baiyoke Sky Hotel, Bangkok, 309 m.
The tallest free-standing air traffic control tower: Suvarnabhumi Airport Control Tower, Samut Prakan, 132.2 m.
 The largest train station: Bang Sue Grand Station, Chatuchak, Bangkok, 274,192 m2, 26 platforms, 600 meters long.
 The largest single-building airport terminal: Suvarnabhumi Airport, Samut Prakan, 563,000 m2

Finance 

 The richest person in Thailand: Chearavanont Family, 966,400 Million Baht.
 The largest corporation in Thailand: PTT Public Company Limited, Total assets: 2,823,897 million Baht (Q2 2021)
 The oldest bank in Thailand: Siam Commercial Bank, Bangkok, 1907

Geography 
 The tallest mountain: Doi Inthanon, Chom Thong, Chiang Mai, 2,565 m.
The largest lake: Songkhla Lake, Songkla and Phattalung, 1,040 km2
 The largest island: Phuket Island, Phuket, 543 km2
 The longest river: Mekong River, Isan, 4,350 km.
 The longest river flowing wholly within Thailand: Chi River, Central Isan, 765 km.
 The longest river in Southern Thailand: Tapi River, Surat Thani and Nakhon Si Thammarat, 230 km.

Political entities 

 The largest province:  Nakhon Ratchasima, 20,736 km2 
 The smallest province:  Samut Songkhram, 417 km2
The largest district by area: Umphang District, Tak, 4,325 km2
Province-level entity with the most districts :  Nakhon Ratchasima, 32 Districts.
Province-level entity with the most subdistricts: Nakhon Ratchasima, 287 Subdistricts.
Province-level entity with the longest shoreline: Prachuap Khiri Kan: 251 km.
Latest province-level entity: Bueng Kan, established in 2011.
Latest district-level entity: Galyani Vadhana District, Chiang mai, established in 2009.

Politics and government 

 The longest reigning monarch: King Bhumibol Adulyadej, 70 years.
 The longest-serving prime minister: Field Marshal Plaek Pibulsongkhram, 14 years, 11 months, and 18 days.
 The shortest-serving prime minister: Tawee Boonyaket, 18 days.
 The youngest prime minister to ever occupy office: Seni Pramoj, 40 years old.
The oldest political party: Democrat Party: founded in 1946.

Transportation 

 The longest railway line: Southern Line, 1,144.29 km.
 The longest highway: Highway 4 (Phet Kasem Road), Central and Southern Thailand, 1,274 km.
 The longest concrete bridge: Tinsulanond Bridge, Songkla, 2.6 km.

Others 

Highest temperature recorded: 44.6 °C, Mae Hong Son, 28 April 2016
 Lowest temperature recorded: -1.4 °C, Sakon Nakhon, 2 Jan 1974
 The deadliest tsunami: 2004 Indian Ocean tsunami, 4,812 confirmed deaths, 8,457 injuries, and 4,499 missing.

See also 
 List of firsts in Thailand

References 

 
records